Jung Dae-hyun (born June 28, 1993), also known mononymously as Daehyun, is a South Korean singer and actor. He debuted as an idol in the six-member group B.A.P under TS Entertainment, where he served as the main vocalist from 2012 to its dissolution in 2019. Following his departure from TS Entertainment, he released his debut mini-album Chapter2 "27" in April 2019. Jung has ventured into musical theater since being cast for Napoleon in 2017.

Early life
Jung was born on June 28, 1993, in Gwangju, South Jeolla Province. The second and younger son of his hardware store-owning father and mother, he lived in a wealthy household. He aspired to become a singer after watching TVXQ and he began to sing as a child. While enrolled in kindergarten, the 1997 Asian financial crisis drove his family into poverty. Jung and his family moved to Busan, where he attended elementary and middle school. He stopped singing amidst worries of his career in his third year of middle school. After abandoning the idea to attend an arts high school with expensive tuition payments, Jung applied to an institution with a "practical" music department and was accepted. During his second year in high school, he went to a youth training center where he practiced vocalizing and learned b-boying. Upon a suggestion from a friend, Jung enrolled in a hagwon in the Haeundae District where he received specialized training; he attended for approximately one year.

Career

Career beginnings and B.A.P

Jung learned about auditions being held by agency TS Entertainment in Busan and he was scheduled to take part, but decided to perform at a competition during that time and was ranked second place. The record label contacted him for another opportunity and he traveled to Seoul for the audition. On his train ride back to Busan, he received his notice of acceptance. He was a trainee under the company for six months.

Jung was revealed as a member of idol sextet B.A.P on January 16, 2012, where he served as the main vocalist. The group debuted ten days later with its single album Warrior. In November 2014, the group filed a lawsuit against its agency. The members sought to nullify its contract with the company citing "unfair conditions and profit distribution". In August of the following year, the two parties ultimately settled and B.A.P resumed its activities under TS Entertainment. In August and December 2018, Yongguk and Zelo left the group and record label following the expiration of their contracts, respectively. Jung and the remaining three members left the agency in February 2019, leading the dissolution of B.A.P.

As a soloist
In March 2019, Jung initiated a crowdfunding campaign with the company Culture Bridge to acquire funds for his debut mini-album. He was criticized for the costs of the benefits provided to patrons who contributed between –₩500,000 (US$–$), which were deemed "excessive". He was compared to former bandmate Yongguk, who was preparing a "musically ambitious" solo album at the time without crowdfunding, which was perceived as "authentic". Jung sympathized with his fans and lamented partaking in crowdfunding. Chapter2 "27" was released on April 5. Jung—who no longer identifies as an idol—contributed to the lyrics, composition, and production of the record. Jung signed with agency STX Lionheart two months later. Under the company, he released his first single album Aight and its title track on October 11.

Jung was cast for the musical Grease, where he played the lead role of Danny. The production ran from November 2019 to February 2020. He contributed a song entitled "All Things Will Pass" on the original soundtrack for JTBC's television series Sweet Munchies. Jung was cast in the musical The Moment as The Boy, originally slated to run from July through September 2020. Due to stringent restrictions following an uptick of infections amid the COVID-19 pandemic, performances only operated through the end of August. His first Japanese single "Amazing" was released on November 25.

Personal life 
He enlisted in mandatory military service on November 17, 2020. He was discharged from military service on May 16, 2022.

Musical style
Jung cites Jang Woo-hyuk as a role model.

Discography

Albums

Extended plays

Single albums

Singles

As lead artist

Guest appearances

Filmography

Web series

Theater

References

1993 births
21st-century South Korean singers
21st-century South Korean male actors
B.A.P (South Korean band) members
Japanese-language singers of South Korea
K-pop singers
Living people
People from Gwangju
South Korean male idols
South Korean male singers
South Korean male musical theatre actors
TS Entertainment artists